Cherielynn Westrich (born January 21, 1966) is an American politician from the state of Iowa.

Westrich was born in Missouri in 1966. She resides in Ottumwa, Iowa.

Career
Prior to politics, Westrich had been involved in the music industry as a vocalist and keyboardist for The Rentals, as a vocalist and bassist for Supersport 2000, and also as the singer for The Slow Signal Fade.

Westrich has appeared on the television program Overhaulin', where she's worked on cars. She owns MalWood USA LLC, a manufacturer of hydraulic clutch pedals in Ottumwa, Iowa.

Westrich announced her candidacy for the vacant senate seat in District 13 following the passage of the (second) redistricting map in October 2021.

Electoral history
*incumbent

2018

2020

2022

References

External links
Cherielynn Westrich @Ballotpedia

|-

Living people
1966 births
Republican Party members of the Iowa House of Representatives
21st-century American politicians
The Rentals members
People from Ottumwa, Iowa
American rock keyboardists
Singers from Iowa
20th-century American women singers
20th-century American singers
Guitarists from Iowa
American rock singers
21st-century American women politicians
Singers from Missouri
Guitarists from Missouri
American rock bass guitarists